Adam Kovacevich is an American lobbyist and the CEO and founder of Chamber of Progress. He formerly worked as a Google executive and Democratic aide.

Early life and education
Kovacevich is the son of John J. Kovacevich, a California agriculture businessman who owned the 650-acre non-union Kovacevich Vineyards outside Bakersfield, California. He graduated from Harvard University.

While at Harvard, Kovacevich befriended Tom Cotton, and would later support several of the Arkansas Republican's political campaigns. Kovacevich said of Cotton, “I support him as a friend, but that doesn’t mean we agree on policies.”

As a student, Kovacevich lobbied Harvard to end a ban on serving grapes that had been organized to express solidarity with a 1984 United Farm Workers grape boycott. Supporters of the ban from National Council of La Raza opposed Kovacevich's efforts, saying the grape ban was about respecting the human rights of farmworkers. Kovacevich rebutted criticism of the working conditions of farm laborers by noting that, at his family's vineyards, workers were permitted to listen to the radio while picking grapes. Kovacevich was successful in having the Harvard grape ban overturned. In 2000, following the vote by Stanford students to overturn their university's grape ban, the United Farm Workers announced a permanent end to its grape boycott.

Career
After graduating from Harvard, Kovacevich worked in Democratic politics. He served as spokesperson for then-congressman Cal Dooley, co-founder of the moderate New Democrat Coalition. He also worked for Senator Joe Lieberman in the United States Senate and on his 2004 presidential campaign and for Inez Tenenbaum on her 2004 campaign for the United States Senate.

In 2007, he went to work for Google, where he spent 12 years, eventually becoming senior director of public policy. He launched Google’s public policy blog.

His op-eds, on tech issues, have appeared in media such as the Pittsburgh Tribune-Review, The Philadelphia Inquirer, and Fortune, and he has appeared on TV channels such as Cheddar, C-SPAN, and Bloomberg Television.

Politics
Kovacevich describes himself as a progressive, though others have disputed this assertion. Speaking of Kovacevich, Mike Lux, board chair of American Family Voices, said in 2021 that "there is no evidence that this guy is progressive".

During his time at Google, Kovacevich personally donated to both Democratic and Republican candidates.

In 2021, Kovacevich expressed support for President Biden’s proposed tax increase on corporations.

Personal life
According to Kovacevich, he lives in Arlington, Virginia, and is married with three children.

References

Harvard University alumni
Lobbyists
People from California
Living people
Year of birth missing (living people)